Christopher Maxo Guldahl Gundersen (born 16 October 1983) is a Norwegian sailor and world champion.

He received a gold medal in the Europe class at the 2004 World Championships. Gundersen lives permanently in Oslo, together with his wife, the former sailor Siren Sundby. He studied medicine at the University of Oslo.

He competed in the 49er class at the 2008 Summer Olympics in Beijing.

References

External links
 
 
 

1983 births
Living people
Norwegian male sailors (sport)
Europe class world champions
World champions in sailing for Norway
Olympic sailors of Norway
Sailors at the 2008 Summer Olympics – 49er
Sportspeople from Bærum